The yellowish white-eye (Zosterops nigrorum) or golden-yellow white-eye, is a species of bird in the family Zosteropidae. It is endemic to the Philippines.

Its natural habitat is subtropical or tropical moist lowland forests.

References

yellowish white-eye
Endemic birds of the Philippines
yellowish white-eye
Taxonomy articles created by Polbot